Mount Macdonald may refer to:

 Mount Macdonald, a mountain in British Columbia
 Mount Macdonald (Yukon), a mountain in Yukon Territory, Canada
 Mount Macdonald (Antarctica), a mountain in Antarctica

See also
 Mount McDonald, another mountain in Antarctica